Private Collection is the ninth studio album by R&B singer Miki Howard that was released in 2008 by her label. The first five tracks are a blend of R&B/soul songs co-produced by Howard and producer/singer Chuckii Booker. Howard collaborated with pianist, composer, and producer Brandon McCune to produce five of her favorite classic standards. Howard sings interpretations of "Skylark", "Guess Who?" and "Days of Wine and Roses".

Track listing

Notes
"Guess Who?" and "Count My Blessings" renamed for this album, originally titled as "Guess Who I Say Today" and "Count Your Blessings (Instead of Sheep)".

Personnel
Miki Howard – Vocals, Composer 
Chuckii Booker – Keyboards, Background Vocals, Composer
Brandon McCune – Piano
Trevor Allen – Bass
Producer – Chuckii Booker, Brandon McCune, Miki Howard

Charts

References

External links
mikihowardmedia.com
soultracks.com

2008 albums
Miki Howard albums